Marenglen Verli (born 1951) is an Albanian historian and scholar. Since 2009, he is a member of the Academy of Sciences of Albania.

Life
Verli was born in Tirana on 19 December 1951. After finishing the high school "Petro Nini Luarasi", he entered the Faculty of History-Philology of the University of Tirana, History-Geography branch. During 1973–79 he worked as teacher in the town of Laç. In 1979 he started in the Institute of History in Tirana, holding the position of the "scientific personnel" until 2013. In 1985 he revived the title "Kandidat i shkencave historike" (Candidate of history sciences), and "Doktor i Shkencave" (Doctor of Sciences) in 1994, in 1997 "Associated Professor", and in 2001 "Professor". From 2005–2008 he served also as director of the Institute of History, and editor-in-chief of the Studime historike periodical. With the establishment of the Centre of Albanological Studies (CAS) in 2008, Verli started as departmental director of the Institute of History, now part of CAS, and member of the CAS Academic Senate. Since 2009, he is an Associated Academic of the Academy of Science of Albania.
For over 30 years, he has been a lecturer of the University of Tirana (Faculty of History-Philology, and Faculty of Social Sciences), Doctorate Center of CAS, and Aleksandër Xhuvani University in Elbasan. As an author and co-author, he lists many publications, profiled in the history of the Albanians within former Yugoslavia areas.

Publications
As of 2015:

References

1951 births
Living people
Members of the Academy of Sciences of Albania
Writers from Tirana
University of Tirana alumni
Albanian schoolteachers
20th-century Albanian historians
21st-century Albanian historians
Academic staff of the University of Tirana
Academic staff of the University of Elbasan